The Sun House on Frognal Way, Frognal, Hampstead, London, UK, is a modernist house built in 1935–1936 by Maxwell Fry. It is a Grade II* listed building.

References

Houses completed in 1936
Grade II* listed buildings in the London Borough of Camden
Grade II* listed houses in London
Houses in Hampstead
Modernist architecture in London
Maxwell Fry buildings
Frognal